This is the discography of American jazz-rock group Blood, Sweat & Tears.

Albums

Studio albums

Live albums

Soundtrack albums

Compilation albums

Singles

Notes

References

Discographies of American artists
Rock music group discographies